This is a list of cities and towns in Bhutan.

List
 Chhukha
 Daga
 Damphu 
 Gasa
 Gelephu
 Ha
 Jakar
 Lhuntshi 
 Mongar
 Paro
 Pemagatsel
 Phuntsholing
 Punakha
 Samtse
 Samdrup Jongkhar
 Thimphu
 Trashigang
 Tongsa
 Wangdue Phodrang
 Zhemgang

10 largest cities

Cities, towns and villages

References

 
Bhutan
Cities
Bhutan

simple:Bhutan#Cities and towns